When Ice Met Cream is an EP released by The Brunettes. It was released in 2005 by Lil' Chief Records.

Track listing
 "When Ice Met Cream" - 3:19
 "Pink Ribbons" - 2:27
 "Hulk is Hulk" - 3:21
 "The Ace of Space" - 2:31
 "The Outsider" - 2:37
 "Goodnight Little Cherub Boy" - 2:26

Personnel
 Jonathan Bree — Vocals, Guitar, Synthesizer, Percussion
 Heather Mansfield — Vocals, Keyboards, Glockenspiel, Clarinet, Harmonica
 James Milne — Backing vocals, Guitar, Percussion
 Ryan McPhun — Backing vocals
 Mike Hall — Bass, Whistle
 Kari Hammon — Drums
 Nick Harte — Drums
 Amee Robinson — Tenor sax
 Harry Cundy — Trumpet

External links
Lil' Chief Records: The Brunettes
Lil' Chief Records
The Brunettes on MySpace

The Brunettes albums
2005 EPs
Lil' Chief Records EPs